Chhatarpura is a village in Sahar block of Bhojpur district, Bihar, India.

Demographics
As of 2011 Indian Census, Chhatarpura had a total population of 1,524, of which 760 were males and 764 were females. Population within the age group of 0 to 6 years was 285. The total number of literates were 851 (55.8%), with 494 (65%) males and 357 (46.7%) females. However, the effective literacy rate of 7+ age population was 68.7%. The Scheduled Castes population was 288, of which males were 143 and females 145. Chhatarpura had 260 households in 2011.

Transportation
Taxi service is available in the village. Bus service available within 2 km.

Nearby towns
Nearest town 1:Arrah(Dist:30 km)
Nearest town 2:Arwal (Dist:7 km)

References

Villages in Bhojpur district, India